Sidéradougou is a town in southwestern Burkina Faso. It is near the city of Bobo-Dioulasso. Sidéradougou is the capital of Sidéradougou Department and has a population of 11,443.

References

Populated places in the Cascades Region